The 2023 FIVB Volleyball Women's Nations League will be the fifth edition of the FIVB Volleyball Women's Nations League, an annual Women's international volleyball tournament. The competition will be held between 30 May to 16 July 2023, and the final round will take place in  College Park Center, Arlington,Texas,United States.

Following the results of 2022 Nations League and 2022 Challenger Cup, Belgium were replaced by debutants Croatia in this edition.

Qualification
Sixteen teams qualified for the competition. Eleven of them qualified as core teams which cannot face relegation. Five other teams were selected as challenger teams which could be relegated from the tournament. Croatia replaced Belgium after winning the 2022 Challenger Cup.

Format

Preliminary round
The format of play is the same as edition 2022. The new format will see 16 women's teams competing in pools of 8 teams during the pool phase. Each team plays 12 matches during the pool stage. Eight teams will then move into the final knockout phase of the competition.

Final round
The VNL Finals will see the seven strongest teams along with the finals host country moving directly to the knockout phase which will consist of eight matches in total: four quarterfinals, two semi-finals and the bronze and gold medal matches.

Final 8 direct elimination formula:
 The first ranked team will play a quarterfinal match against the eighth ranked team, the second ranked team will play a quarterfinal match against the seventh ranked team, the third ranked team will play a quarterfinal match against the sixth ranked team, the fourth ranked team will play a quarterfinal match against the fifth ranked team.
 The Host Team is placed in first position if the team is among the top 8 teams in the Final Standings after the VNL Preliminary Phase.
 The Host Team is placed in eighth position if the team is not among the top 8 teams in the Final Standings after the VNL Preliminary Phase.

Pool composition
The overview of pools was released on 11 November 2022.

Venues

Preliminary round
TBA

Final round

Competition schedule

Pool standing procedure
 Total number of victories (matches won, matches lost)
 In the event of a tie, the following first tiebreaker will apply: The teams will be ranked by the most points gained per match as follows:
Match won 3–0 or 3–1: 3 points for the winner, 0 points for the loser
Match won 3–2: 2 points for the winner, 1 point for the loser
Match forfeited: 3 points for the winner, 0 points (0–25, 0–25, 0–25) for the loser
 If teams are still tied after examining the number of victories and points gained, then the FIVB will examine the results in order to break the tie in the following order:
Sets quotient: if two or more teams are tied on the number of points gained, they will be ranked by the quotient resulting from the division of the number of all sets won by the number of all sets lost.
Points quotient: if the tie persists based on the sets quotient, the teams will be ranked by the quotient resulting from the division of all points scored by the total of points lost during all sets.
If the tie persists based on the points quotient, the tie will be broken based on the team that won the match of the Round Robin Phase between the tied teams. When the tie in points quotient is between three or more teams, these teams ranked taking into consideration only the matches involving the teams in question.

Squads

Preliminary round

Ranking

|}
Source: VNL 2023 standings

Week 1

Pool 1
All times are Further-eastern European Time (UTC+03:00).
|}

Pool 2
All times are Japan Standard Time (UTC+09:00).
|}

Week 2

Pool 3
All times are Hong Kong Time (UTC+08:00).
|}

Pool 4
All times are Brasília Time (UTC−03:00).
|}

Week 3

Pool 5
All times are Korea Standard Time (UTC+09:00).
|}

Pool 6
All times are Thailand Standard Time (UTC+07:00).
|}

Final round
All times are Eastern Daylight Time (UTC−06:00).

Quarterfinals
|}

Semifinals
|}

3rd place match
|}

Final
|}

Final standing

Awards

Most Valuable Player

Best Setter

Best Outside Spikers

Best Middle Blockers

Best Opposite Spiker

Best Libero

See also
2023 FIVB Volleyball Men's Nations League
2023 FIVB Volleyball Women's Challenger Cup

References

External links
Fédération Internationale de Volleyball – official website
FIVB Volleyball Nations League 2023 – official competition website

2023
FIVB
2023 in volleyball
FIVB
2023
FIVB
FIVB
FIVB
FIVB
Nations League
2023
2023